The office of Chief Bailiff of Hereford, in Hereford, England, was a feudal appointment instigated by the feudal vassalage owed by an oath of fealty to the overlordship of the King of England. The Bailiwick of Hereford was created after the Norman Conquest in the ancient Anglo-Saxon jurisdiction of the shire. Deriving from Normandy French baillieu, the word is a combination of the two concepts of bail and lieu, referring to payments made to courts leet. It was the first imposition on the city of Hereford of a two-tier feudal jurisdiction, creating a civic officer of the king's court (loi civile) along Roman law lines. The chief bailiff's principal duty was as the lord paramount of the city burgesses. This title is usually used in the records. Each county had an escheator, whose main role was to collect fines, customs, duties, and levies owed to the Crown.

In order to raise money for the Third Crusade, Richard I sold the township to its citizens on 9 October 1189. The chief bailiff became the lord of the city and the king's representative in his absence abroad for the whole shire county. The Office of Chief Bailiff was first recorded in 1261, following the Provisions of Oxford, and the arrest of a number of Oxford men in Hereford. The defeat of Simon de Montfort ended the provision of Magna Carta for rule by Parliament. After the Lord Edward (later Edward I) escaped from the town's gaol, where he had been taken by baronial rebels, and where he almost died in 1268, he compelled his enemies to sign a truce at Westminster by 1270. The office of bailiff was eventually superseded by a mayor, but the legalistic character of the office at least offered an appellate forum.

As an officer of the king's court, the bailiff also passed judgement on cases in camera, commissioned investigations, and enforced collection. These cases were mostly inquisitions into inheritance, alienation of lands, and rights of wardship, with the escheator as an inquisitorial presiding judge. For example, by 1291 Reginald Moniword had been made a judge. However historians have noted his lack of real power.

List of Bailiffs of Hereford

Notes

References

External links

Hereford